Triumph Brewing Company is a regional brewpub operator with locations in Princeton, New Jersey; Red Bank, New Jersey; New Hope, Pennsylvania; and formerly Philadelphia.

The original operating name "Victory Brewing Company" was replaced to avoid trademark disputes with an existing United Kingdom brand; the Victory Brewing Company of Downingtown, Pennsylvania had yet to be established. Initial construction plans for a Lambertville, New Jersey location never materialized.

History
Renovation of the Princeton location began in the spring of 1994 and it opened to the public on March 19, 1995. The first purpose-built brewpub in the state, the  facility features  cathedral ceilings, seating for over 275 people, and a two-story, glass-enclosed brewhouse. The non-automated 11-barrel stainless steel brewery was fabricated by Newlands Systems of Abbotsford, British Columbia. In 2006, The Star-Ledger called it "probably the state's grandest brew pub grandest," and in 2005, New Jersey Monthly described the interior as the "most architecturally striking" of any in the state. The brewing equipment is behind the bar and visible to patrons, and the decor is industrial chic. The brewpub "has long produced more beer than any" other in the state.

Triumph's second location opened April 24, 2003, at Union Square in New Hope, Pennsylvania. Located on the site of a Union Camp Corporation paper bag manufacturing facility, this redeveloped building formerly served as storage for massive bulk rolls of paper. It is adjacent to the historic New Hope and Ivyland Railroad station and the James A. Michener Art Museum.

Triumph's third location opened on April 4, 2007, at 117-121 Chestnut Street in Old City, Philadelphia. In 2014 this location was closed and sold to 2nd Story Brewing Co.

The Red Bank location was approved in 2006, and construction began in 2015; it opened November 5, 2018.

The Princeton and New Hope locations were designed by Richardson Smith Architects. The Philadelphia location was designed by Riscala Design.

Awards

GABF Medals

References

External links
Triumph Brewing Company Official Site

 Philadelphia Magazine review
The Princeton Packet, June 29, 2005 -  Triumph Brewing Company, Kate and Tom O'Neill, TimeOFF Restaurant review of brewpub.

Companies based in Princeton, New Jersey
Beer brewing companies based in New Jersey